Kermanshah Province's codes are 19, 29 and 39. But 39 is still not in use. In public cars, Taxis and Governal cars the letter is always the same. But in simple cars this letter (ب) depends on the city.

19
19 is Kermanshah county's code and all of the letters are for Kermanshah.

29

Road transport in Iran
Transportation in Kermanshah Province